Mamma mia (an Italian interjection, literally "my mom"), Mammamia, Mamamia or Mumma Mia may refer to:

Music

Works associated with ABBA 
 "Mamma Mia" (ABBA song), a 1975 ABBA song
 Mamma Mia! (musical), a stage play based on ABBA songs, which premiered in London in 1999 
 Mamma Mia! (film), a 2008 film based on the musical
 Mamma Mia! Here We Go Again, 2018 film sequel

Other artists
 ¡Mamma Mia!, a 1988 album by Mexican pop singer Verónica Castro
 "Mamma Mia" (Darin song), 2014
 "Mamma Mia (He's Italiano)", 2014 song by Elena Gheorghe
 "Mama Mia" (In-Grid song), 2005
 "Mamma Mia" (Kara song), 2014
 Mamma Mia! (SF9 EP), 2018
 "Mama Mia", a song by Lil Wayne from the album Funeral
 "Mammamia" (Måneskin song), 2021

Film and television
 "Mamma Mia" (30 Rock), a third-season episode of the NBC television series 30 Rock
 "Mamma Mia" (Frasier), a seventh-season episode of the American television series Frasier
 "Mamma Mia" (Supernatural), a twelfth-season episode of the American television series Supernatural
 Mammamia!, an Italian television program
 Mamma Mia (1995 film), a Ghanaian film

Other
 Mamamia (website), an Australian opinion and lifestyle website targeted at women
Mammamia, a genus of Italian cave-dwelling millipedes
 Mama Mia Trattoria, an Italian restaurant housed in Portland, Oregon